Yao Yizhong (280–352), posthumously honored as Emperor Jingyuan, was a Qiang military general of the Later Zhao dynasty during the Sixteen Kingdoms period. Starting out as a refugee leader during the Disaster of Yongjia, Yizhong later submitted to Later Zhao in 329, where he became a favorite general of the state's third ruler, Shi Hu. As Zhao collapsed in 350, he sided with Shi Zhi against the Ran Wei breakaway state, becoming one of Shi Zhi's top commander, but ultimately could not prevent its demise in 351. After Yizhong's death in 352, his fifth son Yao Xiang led his family to join the Jin dynasty (266–420) before becoming a roving warlord in the Central Plains. Yizhong's twenty-fourth son, Yao Chang, would go on to establish the Later Qin dynasty and posthumously honor him as an emperor in 384.

Background and early career 
Yao Yizhong was a Qiang chieftain from Chiting county, Nan'an commandary (赤亭, 南安郡; southeast of present-day Longxi County, Gansu). His family claimed to be descendants of Yu the Great and had a long conflicting history with the Han dynasty. His ancestor, Tianyu (填虞) harassed the western regions during the time of Emperor Guangwu of Han's reign between 57 to 58 AD but was eventually driven out by the general Ma Wu. Yizhong's great-great-great-grandfather was Qianna (遷那), who submitted to Han and moved in to what became Yizhong's birthplace. Yizhong's father Yao Kehui (姚柯回) served Cao Wei during the Three Kingdoms period as General Who Conquers The West, Colonel Who Organizes The Rong and Protector of the Western Qiang. In his youth, Yizhong was characterised as dutiful and well-respected all around.

In 312, a year after the Disaster of Yongjia, Yao Yizhong moved to Yumei (榆眉; east of present-day Qianyang County, Shaanxi) and set his base, where he opened himself to provide shelter to refugees from the east. He attracted thousands of both tribal and Han refugees wishing to escape the chaos. Soon, he proclaimed himself as Inspector of Yongzhou and Colonel Who Protects the Qiang. After the emperor of Han Zhao, Liu Yao defeated the rebel Chen An in 323, Liu Yao formally appointed him as General Who Pacifies the West and Duke of Pingxiang.

Service under Shi Le 
After Han Zhao was conquered by its rival state, Later Zhao, Yizhong submitted to the Later Zhao general Shi Hu. Yizhong advised Shi Hu to relocate the strong and influential families of Longshang (隴上; north of present-day Shaanxi and west of present-day Gansu) to the region surrounding their capital, Xiangguo. This, according to Yizhong, would keep the families in check while also strengthening the capital. Shi Hu considered his suggestion and persuaded his uncle, Zhao's ruler, Shi Le, to award Yizhong with the offices of General Who Maintains The West and Commander of the Left of the Six Tribes.

In 330, the Jin rebel Zu Yue involved in Su Jun's rebellion fled to Later Zhao, seeking their protection. Shi Le entertained him initially but deep down he was not fond of Zu Yue, and even his close advisor Cheng Xia urged him to execute him and his family, believing that they could not be trusted. Yao Yizhong supported Cheng Xia's idea, sending Shi Le a memorial that states, "Zu Yue was a rebellious thief in Jin who drove the Empress Dowager to death and was not loyal to his lord. Yet, Your Majesty continues to spoil him, and your ministers fear this will sprout into chaos. This is simply the beginning." Shi Le took their advice and executed Zu Yue along with his family.

Service under Shi Hong and Shi Hu 
Shi Le died in 333, leaving the throne to his son Shi Hong. However, not long after Shi Le's death, Shi Hu seized the government in a coup and made Shi Hong a puppet emperor. Shi Hu acted out Yizhong's early suggestion of moving the powerful families of Longsheng to the capital region and appointed Yizhong Grand Commander of the Western Qiang, relocating him and thousands of families from the west to Shetou (灄頭; southeast of present-day Zaoqiang County, Hebei), Qinghe commandary. 

The following year, Shi Hu killed Shi Hong and declared himself "Regent Heavenly Prince". Yizhong was not pleased with what had happened, so he feigned illness to avoid needing to congratulate Shi Hu. He was eventually forced to in the end, and when the two finally met, Yizhong sternly criticised him for what he had done to Shi Hong. Shi Hu defended himself by saying that Shi Hong was too young for a ruler and would not be able to handle affairs. Yizhong was not satisfied with Shi Hu's answer, but at the same time, Shi Hu did not dare to punish Yizhong. Eventually, Yizhong came to accept Shi Hong's fate. 

In 338, he served as the Champion General during the Later Zhao and Former Yan joint attack on the Duan tribe. In the assault, he and Zhi Xiong led 70,000 troops and headed the vanguard in attacking Duan Liao (段遼). Though the Duan were defeated, the campaign escalated into a war between Zhao and Yan after Shi Hu suspected Yan of betraying the alliance, although Yizhong's involvement in this is not recorded.  In 345, he was made Credential Bearer and Grand Champion General and given command over ten commanderies and the Six Tribes. 

Yizhong stood out in Shi Hu court for being both humble yet very blunt with his words, his most notable habit being that he referred to everyone, including Shi Hu, as "you (汝; rǔ)" rather than their respective titles when talking to them. Shi Hu greatly valued him and put aside any judgement when it comes to him. On major discussions, Shi Hu always gave Yizhong the final say on what was to be carried out, and the ministers all feared him because of this. Despite Shi Hu's flattery, Yizhong remained stern and strict when it comes to the law. On one occasion, the brother of Shi Hu's favorite concubine, Zuo Wei (左尉), trespassed into his camp and harassed the soldiers. Yizhong eventually caught him and, despite Zuo Wei's relations, was set to have him executed for his crimes. Zuo Wei was said to have kowtowed relentlessly until his head began to bleed. Yizhong's subordinate urged him to let him off, and so Yizhong did.

Liang Du's Rebellion 
In 349, Shi Hu had chosen Shi Shi as his new heir and declared himself Heavenly Prince, but a crisis struck Zhao when Shi Hu was granting out amnesty. He had left out the guards of one of his sons, Shi Xuan (石宣), who were exiled to Liaodong after Xuan was executed for attempting to assassinate his father. The guards rallied under their captain Liang Du (梁犢) and marched south to capture Luoyang, defeating many generals in their way. The rebels' victories shocked Shi Hu so much that he was driven to illness. 

As the rebels approached Luoyang, Shi Hu ordered his son, Shi Bin to quell the rebellion together with Yizhong and Pu Hong. Before leaving to face them, Yizhong visited the capital to personally meet with Shi Hu. As Hu was sick, he refused to come out and instead had Yizhong treated with food at the royal table. Yizhong was furious by this and demanded Shi Hu to meet him at once. After Shi Hu finally came out to see him, Yizhong scolded Shi Hu for worrying too much about Shi Xuan's death and the rebels. Yizhong then promised Shi Hu that he would put an end to rebellion swiftly.

Shi Hu immediately made Yizhong Commissioner Bearing Credentials, Palace Attendant, and General Who Conquers The West. He also gifted Yizhong an armoured horse without formality or ceremony as Yizhong disliked them. Before embarking, he said to Shi Hu, "Observe, do you think this Old Qiang will smash these rebels?" He wore his armour and mounted his new steed before leaving without any further say. Yizhong joined the Grand Commander Shi Bin (石斌) at Xingyang, where he took Liang Du's head and destroyed the remaining rebel forces. With the rebellion crushed, Shi Hu awarded Yizhong with the title Duke of Xiping commandary.

Shi Hu's death and war with Ran Min

Reign of Shi Shi and Shi Zun 
Despite the rebellion's demise, Shi Hu's body had taken a toll on him and he would die shortly after in 349. He was succeeded by his preteen son Shi Shi as expected but many including Yao Yizhong were angry that actual power was held by Empress Dowager Liu and the Prime Minister Zhang Chai in the court. This was made worse when Liu and Zhang sent an army to kill the Minister of Works, Li Nong. While returning from their campaign against Liang Du, Yizhong and other prominent generals such as Pu Hong and Shi Min conspired with Shi Shi's half-brother, Shi Zun at Licheng (李城; in present-day Wen County, Henan) to overthrow Shi Shi and his regents. Later, Shi Zun took the capital and executed Shi Shi, the Empress Dowager and Zhang Chai along with their followers, proclaiming himself as the new emperor.

Shi Zun did not last a year however, as he was executed following a coup by Shi Min, the adopted Han Chinese grandson of Shi Hu, who had found out of Zun's plans to kill him. Shi Min and his ally Li Nong installed Zun's brother Shi Jian as the new emperor, but power was virtually held by the duo. Shi Jian's brother, Shi Zhi, who was positioned in Xiangguo (襄國, in modern Xingtai, Hebei) called for a coalition against Shi Min and Li Nong. Among those who joined the coalition was Yizhong, who rose in Shetou.

Wei-Zhao War 

The following year, Yao Yizhong camped at Hunqiao (混橋) to campaign against Shi Min (now named Ran Min). His sons Yao Yi (姚益) and Yao Ruo (姚若) managed to escape Yecheng and joined their father. Yizhong and the Di general Pu Hong both wanted the strategic position of Guanyou (關右, west of present-day Tongguan county, Shaanxi). Yizhong sent his son fifth son, Yao Xiang to capture it but Pu Hong routed him and occupied the area. Meanwhile, Shi Zhi formally declared himself as emperor after Shi Jian was killed by Ran Min, and Yizhong was appointed as his Prime Minister of the Right. Meanwhile, Yizhong chose Yao Xiang as his heir due to the popular support that Xiang was receiving.

Ran Min eventually besieged Xiangguo, and Shi Zhi desperately called Yizhong for help. Yizhong sent Yao Xiang to lift the siege, but not before asking him to swear that he would capture Ran Min, and contacted the state of Former Yan to send reinforcements. Former Yan sent Yue Wan and together with Yao Xiang and Shi Kun (石琨), they attacked Ran Min from three sides, dealing him a major defeat. However, Ran Min managed to escape, and after Yao Xiang's return, Yizhong had him flogged for not fulfilling his promise.

Shi Zhi and his ministers were later assassinated by a defector named Liu Xian, allowing Ran Min to occupy the city. With the emperor dead, Yao Yizhong decided to submit to the Jin dynasty. Jin received his surrender and appointed him Grand Chanyu.

Death and posthumous honours 
In 352, Yao Yizhong grew deathly ill. He advised his sons to serve the Jin dynasty, as the Shi clan with the recent deaths of its last members under Shi Kun was no more. Yizhong died shortly after at the age of 72 and was succeeded by Yao Xiang, who marched with his followers south to formally join Jin. Although Yao Xiang served Jin for a while, he claimed independence after his ally Yin Hao grew suspicious of him and tried to kill him. Yao Xiang carried his father's coffin around until he was killed in battle in 357 when fighting Former Qin forces. Former Qin's emperor Fu Sheng ordered that his body be buried as a prince in Ji county (冀縣, present-day Gangu County, Gansu), Tianshui. When his 24th son, Yao Chang, became emperor of Later Qin in 386, Yizhong was posthumously named Emperor Jingyuan.

References 

 Fang, Xuanling (ed.) (648). Book of Jin (Jin Shu).
 Sima, Guang  (1084). Zizhi Tongjian
 Cui, Hong (501–522).  Spring and Autumn Annals of the Sixteen Kingdoms (Shiliuguo Chunqiu)

Later Zhao generals
280 births
352 deaths
Jin dynasty (266–420) people
Former Zhao generals
Later Qin people